Jaipur–Secunderabad Express is an Express train belonging to North Western Railway zone of Indian Railways that run between  and  in India.

Background
This train was Inaugurated on 3 March 2011, As a seasonal line running Secunderabad–Jaipur special train (No. 09735/36). which was maintained under the South Central Railways. Later, it became quite popular for direct connectivity to Rajasthan from South India.

On 25 May 2013, this Special train was converted into Express train with new numbered 19713 / 14 and became the fourth weekly train running between the Jaipur and Hyderabad corridor and also the rake maintenance was also transferred to North Western Railways.

Service
The frequency of this train is weekly, it covers the distance of 1735 km with an average speed of 52 km/hr.

Routes

Traction
As this route is partly-electrified, a WAG-7 & WDM-3A based loco pulls the train to its destination on both sides.

External links
 19713 Jaipur – Secunderabad Express
 19714 Secunderabad – Jaipur Express

References

Rail transport in Rajasthan
Rail transport in Madhya Pradesh
Rail transport in Maharashtra
Rail transport in Telangana
Express trains in India